Erroll Mingo Brown is a retired rear admiral in the United States Coast Guard. Brown was the first African-American promoted to flag rank in the Coast Guard.

Education
After graduating from  Dixie M. Hollins High School in St. Petersburg, Florida, in 1968, Brown enrolled in the U.S. Coast Guard Academy. In 1972, Brown graduated from the U.S. Coast Guard Academy, majoring in Marine Engineering. He also earned a master's degree in naval architect and marine engineering and a second master's in industrial and operations engineering at the University of Michigan. In 1986, Brown received the Master of Business Administration degree from the Rensselaer Polytechnic Institute. He then received a master's degree in national security and strategic studies when he graduated from the Naval War College in 1994.

Service years
Brown served in ships including the Coast Guard icebreaker Burton Island (WAGB-283), Cutter Jarvis (WHEC-725), and Cutter Rush (WHEC-723). He has held positions on board ships including damage control assistant, assistant engineer officer, and maintenance type deck officer. He has also served in the Small Boat Branch as the supervisor for two inspection officers instructors in the Marine Engineering Department at the U. S. Coast Guard Academy, and served as executive officer. He has been a program reviewer in the Office of the Chief of Staff, Programs Division in Coast Guard Headquarters, and has served as the military assistant to the Secretary of Transportation. He was also assigned as chief of the Budget Division in the Office of the Chief of Staff in Coast Guard Headquarters. In 1998, Brown was promoted to rear admiral. Recently, he was the commanding officer of the USCG Integrated Support Command in Portsmouth, VA. Before he retired, he was the Commander of the Maintenance and Logistics Command Atlantic in Norfolk, Virginia.

He retired after 33 years of service. He currently serves as the program evaluator for the Accreditation Board for Engineering and Technology.

He coauthored with Harry Benford of the University of Michigan a book entitled Ship Replacement and Prediction of Economic Life. He presented this to the 25th Annual Colloquium of Shipbuilders in Hamburg, Germany at the University of Hamburg.

Awards and decorations

References

1950 births
Living people
African-American United States Coast Guard personnel
Recipients of the Legion of Merit
United States Coast Guard Academy alumni
United States Coast Guard admirals
People from St. Petersburg, Florida
Rensselaer Polytechnic Institute alumni
University of Michigan College of Engineering alumni
Naval War College alumni
21st-century African-American people
20th-century African-American people